Asking for Flowers is the third studio album by Canadian singer-songwriter Kathleen Edwards. The album was released March 4, 2008, and was well received by critics, similarly to her first two albums released under Zoë Records, Failer and Back to Me.  The Canadian Press said of the album's track list, "unlike your average floral arrangement, there's not a dud in the bunch." The Boston Globe reported that the album had similarities to Edwards' 2005 album Back to Me, but showed maturity as a singer and songwriter.

The album contains many references to figures in the Canadian media, including murder victim Alicia Ross, and controversial former hockey player Marty McSorley.

The album peaked at number 102 on the Billboard 200 and in the number one spot on the Top Heatseekers chart, and was a nominee for the 2008 Polaris Music Prize.

Track listing
All songs written by Kathleen Edwards.
"Buffalo" – 5:15
"The Cheapest Key" – 2:42
"Asking for Flowers" – 5:02
"Alicia Ross" – 5:06
"I Make the Dough, You Get the Glory" – 4:37
"Oil Man's War" – 4:01
"Sure as Shit" – 4:09
"Run" – 3:43
"Oh Canada" – 3:59
"Scared at Night" – 4:09
"Goodnight, California" – 6:28
"Lazy Eye" – 3:29 / "I Can't Give You Up" – 2:32 / "Asking for Flowers" (exclusive version) – 4:48 (All three cuts were online bonus tracks available through various outlets.)

Personnel
 Paul Bryan – bass
 Jim Bryson – piano, backing vocals 
 Burke Carroll – pedal steel guitar
 Gary Craig – drums, percussion
 Colin Cripps – electric guitar, 12 string guitar
 Margaret Edwards – backing vocals
 Kevin Fox – cello
 John Ginty – Hammond organ
 Bob Glaub – bass
 Don Heffington – drums, percussion
 Greg Leisz – electric guitar, pedal steel guitar 
 Anne Lindsay – violin
 Johann Lotter – viola
 Bob Packwood – piano
 Paul Reddick – harmonica
 Justin Rutledge – backing vocals
 Jim Scott – omnichord
 Sebastian Steinberg – bass
 Benmont Tench – piano
 Kathleen Edwards – vocals, acoustic guitar, electric guitar, violin, vibraphone

References

2008 albums
Kathleen Edwards albums